The Chain is a 2019 novel written by Adrian McKinty.

Publication history
McKinty quit writing in 2017 after being evicted from his rented house, citing a lack of income from his novels, and instead took work as an Uber driver and a bartender. Upon hearing of his situation, fellow crime author Don Winslow passed some of his books to his agent, the screenwriter and producer Shane Salerno. In a late-night phone call, Salerno persuaded McKinty to write what would become The Chain. Salerno loaned the author ("advance on the advance") $10,000 to help him survive financially during the process.

The stand-alone thriller was inspired by the chain letters of his youth and contemporary reports of hostage exchanges. McKinty returned to writing after the book landed him a six-figure English-language book deal, and was optioned for a film adaptation by Paramount Pictures. In an interview on CBS McKinty talked about never giving up and took the interviewer, Jeff Glor, to Plum Island, Massachusetts, where The Chain is set. The Chain was published in 37 countries. In June 2020, Universal Pictures acquired the film rights to the novel, with Edgar Wright directing and producing the project and Jane Goldman writing the screenplay.

Awards
2019 Time magazine Books of the Year for The Chain
2020 Theakston's Old Peculier Crime Novel of the Year Award 2020 winner for The Chain.
2020 Ian Fleming Steel Dagger Award longlist for The Chain; CWA Body in the Library longlist for The Chain
2020 International Thriller Writers Award for Best Hardcover Novel, The Chain.
2020 Ned Kelly Award for Best International Crime Fiction for The Chain.
2020 Macavity Awards for Best Mystery Novel by Mystery Readers International for The Chain.
2020 Barry Award (for crime novels) for Best Mystery Novel for The Chain.

Plot summary 
Rachel, a divorcée with cancer, gets a call stating that her daughter, Kylie, has been kidnapped and she is now part of The Chain. To get Kylie back she must kidnap another child. Kylie will be released when the parents of the child Rachel has kidnapped kidnap yet another child and continue the chain.

References

2019 British novels
British thriller novels
Orion Books books